Seymour Krim (May 11, 1922 – August 30, 1989) was an American author, editor and literary critic. He is often categorized with the writers of the Beat Generation. He wrote for the Village Voice, Playboy, New York Element and International Times, among many other publications. He worked for a time at The New Yorker, where Brendan Gill recalled he was often "stripped to the waist."

Career

Krim was born in the Washington Heights section of Manhattan and spent much of his time in New York City. He was widely regarded as part of the New Journalism movement of the 1960s; in 1965 he joined the New York Herald Tribune′s staff, which included Jimmy Breslin, Tom Wolfe and Dick Schaap. His robust prose was often laced with a startling, often funny, candor. In his introduction to Jack Kerouac's novel Desolation Angels, published in 1965, Krim argued for Kerouac's place in the annals of American literature.

He taught writing seminars at a number of universities in the United States and abroad, including Mexico and Israel. For several years during the early 1980s he served as head of The Writers Workshop in Iowa City. His honors included the Longview Award for Literature (1960), a Guggenheim Fellowship (1976) and a Fulbright grant (1985). After suffering from a number of physical setbacks, including a debilitating heart attack, Krim committed suicide in his one-room apartment on East 10th Street by an overdose of barbiturates on August 30, 1989.

Posthumous

Phillip Lopate published Krim's "For My Brothers and Sisters in the Failure Business" in his 1997 anthology The Art of the Personal Essay. In 2001, Saul Bellow included "What's This Cat's Story?" in Editors: The Best from Five Decades. Also in 2001, critic Vivian Gornick praised Krim as "a Jewish Joan Didion" in her book The Situation and the Story. Gornick also included Krim's "Failure Business" on her list of the Ten Greatest Essays, Ever.

Bibliography
 Manhattan: Stories from the Heart of a Great City (1954; co-editor)
 The Beats (1960; editor)
 Views of a Nearsighted Cannoneer (1961)
 Shake It for the World, Smartass (1970)
 You and Me (1974)
 What's This Cat's Story? (1991 Posthumous compilation)

References

 News from The Republic of Letters: Krim's Way

Drug-related suicides in New York City
1922 births
1989 suicides
Writers from New York City
Beat Generation people
Drug-related deaths in New York City
Suicides in New York City